was a Japanese samurai of the Sengoku period through Azuchi–Momoyama period, who served the Akizuki clan of Kyūshū. His court title was Shimotsuke no kami (下野守). He was born to Kusano Chikanaga, but was adopted as heir to the Harada family. He became a vassal of Toyotomi Hideyoshi following Hideyoshi's invasion of Kyūshū; Harada then served as yoriki under Sassa Narimasa and Katō Kiyomasa. He joined Katō Kiyomasa's force in Korea, and died at the Siege of Ulsan.

References

 "Kusano-shi" on Harimaya.com (acc. 12 April 2008)
 "Harada-shi" on Harimaya.com (acc. 12 April 2008)

Samurai
1560 births
1598 deaths
People of the Japanese invasions of Korea (1592–1598)